Mialo Mwapé Mialo (born 30 December 1951) is a Congolese football defender who played for Zaire in the 1974 FIFA World Cup. He also played for Nyiki Lubumbashi.

References

External links
FIFA profile

1951 births
Democratic Republic of the Congo footballers
Democratic Republic of the Congo international footballers
Association football defenders
1974 FIFA World Cup players
1976 African Cup of Nations players
Living people